Shalakho (or ) is a dance famous throughout all of Caucasus.

Performance
In a broadly spread version, two men dance in order to win the favour of a woman. The dance can be performed by one or more dancers, men or women, in a free, Caucasian style of performance. Motions of women can be slow and lyrical. Music of the dance is rapid, which is reflected in the expansive and energetic motions of men.

In Theater and Records
The dance melody was first recorded and arranged for piano by the Armenian composer Nikoghayos Tigranyan in 1895.

The dance was performed in a 1940 Azerbaijani ballet Maiden Tower by Afrasiyab Badalbeyli. In 1942, it was performed in an Armenian ballet called Gayane by Aram Khachaturian.

References

Armenian dances
Azerbaijani dances
Dances of Georgia (country)